Nocardioides panacihumi is a Gram-positive, strictly aerobic, non-spore-forming and non-motile bacterium from the genus Nocardioides which has been isolated from soil from a ginseng field in Pocheon, Korea.

References

Further reading

External links
Type strain of Nocardioides panacihumi at BacDive -  the Bacterial Diversity Metadatabase	

panacihumi
Bacteria described in 2007